Vegetarian Cooking for Everyone is a 1997 cook book by Deborah Madison. It contains 1,400 vegetarian recipes from soups to desserts.

Reception
In 2017 Washington Post Food Editor Joe Yonan listed it as one of three must-have classic vegetarian cookbooks.

In a review of Vegetarian Cooking For Everyone, Gourmet magazine wrote "Before you even read a word, the clean type, elegant, well-organized layout, and helpful illustrations reassure you that you won't be pulling your hair out trying to follow a recipe. And then Madison's warm, knowledgeable prose pulls you in."

Michael Ruhlman noted "For all these reasons, in the 17 years I've been writing about cooks and cooking, I have purchased a single cookbook, several years ago, for myself, a single book to inspire me and broaden my culinary imagination: "Vegetarian Cooking for Everyone," by Deborah Madison, .." and The New Yorker "found Madison to be a charming and non-threatening psychopomp into the realm of what I imagined to be the half-dead, the eaters of what she frequently calls “plant food,” which, to me, sounded like “fish food.”" 

Publishers Weekly gave a starred review writing "Many have tried to create a reliable, encyclopedic vegetarian cookbook, but few have succeeded. Madison (The Greens Cookbook; The Savory Way) comes through with a weighty volume.." and called it an "incredibly complete and triumphant effort."

Awards
1998 IACP Cookbook of the Year - winner
1998 James Beard Vegetarian Book Award - winner
2008 Gourmet August Cookbook Club Pick

The New Vegetarian Cooking for Everyone
In 2014 Madison brought out a revised version about which The Wall Street Journal wrote "Ms. Madison shows herself to be a formidable teacher not just of vegetarian cooking but of imaginative cooking generally."

See also 
 Vegetarian cuisine

References

1997 non-fiction books
American cookbooks
Vegetarian cookbooks